Birdman Rally is a competition where members of the public build home-made gliders, hang gliders and human-powered aircraft, ranging from very serious aircraft to mere costumes, leap from a river– or sea–side jetty, or from a bridge, and compete for distance and entertainment value.

Birdman rallies occur in multiple locations around the world, including Bognor Regis and Worthing in the United Kingdom, the Yarra River in Melbourne, Australia and Lake Biwa in Japan and in China, which has been created by regular entrants in the Bognor Regis event.

History 

The oldest Birdman rally in the world started in Selsey, West Sussex, United Kingdom in 1971.  Moved to Bognor Regis, where it was known as the International Bognor Birdman throughout the 1980s and 1990s, the event moved along the coast to Worthing in 2008 and since 2010 annual rallies have been held in both Bognor Regis and Worthing.

The Australian competition first started in 1972 in Glenelg, South Australia but now occurs as a part of Melbourne's Moomba festival in March.  
 
In New Zealand, the Birdman Rally ran from 1974 to 1979 and beyond including 2013, 2015, 2017, 2019. Festival organiser Martin Wilson ran them as an annual event on the Wellington Waterfront.

Started in 1977, the Japanese competition takes place every year in July, and the majority of competitors come from engineering programmes at universities.

Since 1991, Red Bull has been holding its own  Birdman Rallies under the name Red Bull Flugtag.

References

External links
International Bognor Birdman
Worthing Birdman
Japan's Quirky Festivals: Japan International Birdman Rally
 Japan's 39th International Birdman Rally
 Birdman Rally, Melbourne's Moomba Festival 2017
Ilfracombe Birdman

Aviation competitions and awards
Sport in Australia
Sport in Japan
Sport in Shiga Prefecture